Lawrence Linderman is a writer who has written extensively for Playboy and Penthouse magazines. He also helped Beverly Sills pen her autobiography.

His article "Undercover Angel" in the July, 1981 issue of Playboy was the basis for Larry Ferguson's screenplay for the movie Beyond the Law.

References

External links
Books by Lawrence Linderman on Amazon.com

American magazine journalists
American investigative journalists
Playboy people
Living people
Year of birth missing (living people)